Embrace the Curse is the first full-length album from I Hate Kate, released on April 4, 2007. It features several re-recordings from their Act One EP, and other songs they released earlier through their website.

Track listing
(all songs written by Justin Mauriello, except "Major Tom (Coming Home)" by Peter Schilling)
"Bed of Black Roses" – 3:37
"Embrace the Curse" – 3:58
"She's a Man" - 4:19
"A Story I Can't Write" – 3:31
"It's You" – 4:40
"Then You Kiss" – 3:47
"Always Something" – 3:34
"The Thrill" – 3:23
"Outta My Head" – 3:36
"Love Association" – 4:32  
"Major Tom (Coming Home)" (Peter Schilling cover) - 4:21

Re-release
Embrace the Curse was re-released on June 24, 2008 due to the band signing a record deal with Glassnote Records. Some minor changes were made to the album, including changing the name of "Always Something" to "It's Always Better" and adding the band's third single, "I'm in Love With a Sociopath".
"Bed of Black Roses" - 3:43   
"It's Always Better" - 3:37   
"Then You Kiss" - 3:48   
"Inside Inside" - 4:23   
"I'm in Love with a Sociopath" - 2:54   
"It's You" - 4:07   
"Story I Can't Write" - 3:37   
"Embrace the Curse" - 4:00   
"Major Tom (Coming Home)" (Peter Schilling cover) - 4:21   
"The Thrill" - 3:26   
"Love Association" - 4:38   
"Outta My Head" - 3:46

Personnel
 Justin Mauriello – rhythm guitar, vocals
 Jeremy Berghorst - lead guitar
 Scott Hayden – bass guitar
 Mike Lund – drums

Production
 Dave Colvin – assistant engineer
 Carlos de la Garza – engineer
 Mike Fasano – drum technician
 Vlado Meller – mastering
 Raquel Olivo – photography
 Mark Santangelo – mastering assistant
 Mark Trombino – producer, engineer, mixing

References

2007 albums
Darling Thieves albums
Glassnote Records albums